Henry Jenkins (buried on 9 December 1670 in Bolton-on-Swale, North Riding of Yorkshire) was an English supercentenarian claimant said to have been 169 years old at his death.

Biography

He claimed to have been born in 1501, although parish registers were not required to be maintained until 1538. It is known that he lived at Ellerton on Swale, Scorton, North Riding of Yorkshire and claimed to have been butler to Lord Conyers, of Hornby Castle, where the Abbot of Fountains was a frequent guest, and "did drink a hearty glass with his Lordship." He later followed the occupation of a fisherman and ended his life begging for alms.

Chancery Court records show that in 1667 Jenkins stated on oath that he was aged "one hundreth fifty and seven or thereabouts"; when asked by the judge which notable battle he remembered, he named Flodden Field of 1513 and claimed to have carried arrows to the English archers.
Although his birth date is undocumented, the date of Jenkins's death is known to within days, as his burial is recorded in the parish register of Bolton-on-Swale as having occurred on 9 December 1670. He is described as "a very aged and poor man". 
In 1743, in his memory an obelisk was erected in the churchyard, and a plaque made of black marble was placed inside the church; the inscription on it, composed by Dr Thomas Chapman, Master of Magdalene College, Cambridge,  reads 

In 1829, the journal The Mirror of Literature claimed that if Jenkins had followed his legal obligations, during his life he would have changed his religion eight times, between the reigns of Henry VII and Charles II.

T. H. White's science fiction novel The Master: An Adventure Story (1957) compares the eponymous character, aged 150, with Jenkins.

The village of Kirkby Malzeard, North Yorkshire, had a pub named Henry Jenkins after him, until it closed on 29 June 2008.

References

External links

People from Richmondshire (district)
Longevity myths
1670 deaths
Year of birth unknown
17th-century English people
16th-century English people